Clement Augustus Trott (December 14, 1877 – April 14, 1950) was a highly decorated officer in the United States Army with the rank of major general in the United States Army. A West Point alumnus, Trott participated in the Philippine–American War and World War I, where he distinguished himself as chief of staff of the 5th Division.

Following the War, Trott remained in the Army and rose through the ranks to General officer rank. He completed his career as Commanding general, Fifth Corps Area in September 1941, shortly before the United States entry into World War II.

Early career

Clement A. Trott was born on December 14, 1877 in Milwaukee, Wisconsin as the son of immigrants from Germany. Following high school, he received an appointment to the United States Military Academy at West Point, New York, where he became active in the baseball team and was nicknamed "The Baron" due to his German ancestry. Trott graduated on February 15, 1899 with Bachelor's degree and was commissioned second lieutenant in the Infantry branch.

Many of his classmates became general officers later: Samuel T. Ansell, Charles M. Bundel, Clifton C. Carter, Stanley D. Embick, Robert C. Foy, Stuart Heintzelman, Charles D. Herron, Evan H. Humphrey, Frederick B. Kerr, Leon Kromer, Duncan K. Major Jr., Edward M. Markham, George Van Horn Moseley, Ephraim G. Peyton, George S. Simonds or James A. Woodruff.

Following the graduation, Trott was ordered to Camp Baker near Walker, Minnesota for service with 7th Infantry Regiment. The Seventh Infantry was ordered to San Carlos, Arizona in May 1900 and Trott participated in the guarding of the Mexican Border until August that year, when it was ordered to Fort Logan, Colorado. He was promoted to first lieutenant on September 15, 1900 and joined 5th Infantry Regiment at Fort Sheridan, Illinois.

Trott embarked for the Philippines by the end of March 1901 and participated in the combats against Moro insurgents until November 1903, when he was ordered back to the United States. Upon his arrival stateside, he was stationed at the Plattsburg Barracks until he was ordered to the Infantry and Cavalry School at Fort Leavenworth, Kansas in August 1904. Trott graduated with honors in July of the following year and attended the Command and Staff College also located there.

He completed the instruction on August 20, 1906 and was promoted to the rank of captain. Trott was subsequently ordered back to the United States Military Academy at West Point and assumed duty as an Instructor in the Department of Law. Due to his interest in the baseball during his tenure at the Academy as a Cadet, Trott accepted additional duty as Manager of the team and brought famous coach Sammy Strang to the team.

Trott left West Point in August 1910 and joined his old outfit, 5th Infantry Regiment at Plattsburg Barracks. He served as an Instructor at the Army School of the Line at Fort Leavenworth, Kansas from August to December 1912 and then sailed with 8th Infantry Regiment back to the Philippines.

His second tour in that country ended in September 1915, when he returned stateside and joined the 24th Infantry Regiment at the Presidio of San Francisco. Trott served with his new regiment at Presidio until February 1916, then moved to the Fort D.A. Russell, Wyoming. However during Pancho Villa Expedition in March that year, the 24th Infantry joined the punitive expedition to Mexico and participated in the skirmishes with Villa's forces.

World War I

By the beginning of November 1916, Trott returned to the United States and assumed duty as Assistant Professor of Military Science and Tactics at University of Illinois. During his tenure there, United States entered the World War I and Trott was given new assignment. He was promoted to major on May 15, 1917 and ordered to Fort Sheridan, Illinois, where he assumed duty first as Company and then battalion commander within Officers' Training Camp.

Trott was promoted to the temporary rank of lieutenant colonel on August 5, 1917 and ordered to Camp Sherman, Ohio, where he joined 330th Infantry Regiment, 83rd Division. He was tasked with training of Guardsmen of Ohio National Guard until December 1917 and embarked for France.

In January 1918, Trott joined the British 21st Division as an Observer and after three weeks in that capacity, he was ordered to the Army General Staff College at Langres. He completed the course and served as an Instructor until the end of June 1918, when he served again as an observer, now with American 1st and 2nd Divisions during the combats at Château Thierry and Montdidier fronts.

Trott then rejoined 83rd Division by the beginning of July 1918 and served as Divisional Chief of Staff under Major general Edwin F. Glenn. The 83rd Division did not saw action as a complete formation and provided replacements for other combat formations. Trott was meanwhile promoted to the temporary rank of colonel on July 30, 1918 and joined the headquarters of 5th Division as Chief of Staff under Major general John E. McMahon.

The 5th Division was completely different kind of formation than his previous service with 83rd Division, and Trott had the opportunity to participate in the planning and execution of large military operations. He served in that capacity during the Battle of Saint-Mihiel in mid-September 1918 and then during the Battle of Argonne in October-November that year. Trott distinguished himself in this capacity and was praised by both 5th commanders, generals McMahon and Hanson E. Ely. For his service in France, he was decorated with Army Distinguished Service Medal and also received Silver Star citation for his visits of frontlines during combat. Also Allies of the United States did not forget of him and Trott was appointed Officer of the Legion of Honour and received Croix de Guerre with Palm by the France.

Following the Armistice in November 1918, the 5th Division marched to Luxembourg, where it was stationed near Esch-sur-Alzette for occupation duty until the beginning of July 1919.

Interwar period

Trott returned to the United States by the end of July 1919 and reverted to the peacetime rank of major. He was subsequently ordered to the Army War College in Washington, D.C. and graduated from the senior course in June 1920. Following the graduation, Trott was promoted back to lieutenant colonel on July 1, 1920 and ordered to Camp Grant, Illinois, where he assumed command of 54th Infantry Regiment.

He served in this capacity until January 1921, when he was ordered to the Office of the Chief of Infantry under Major general Walter H. Gordon. Trott served in Training section of that office and was promoted to colonel on November 2, 1921. He was sent to the Governors Island, New York City in July 1924 and joined the headquarters, Second Corps Area under Major general Robert L. Bullard as Liaison Officer, Organized Reserves.

Trott assumed command of 17th Infantry Regiment at Fort Crook, Nebraska in May 1926 and served in this capacity until June 1930, when he was appointed Chief of Staff, 94th Division under Major general Fox Conner. The 94th Division served as the part of Massachusetts Organized Reserve and Trott served four year at its headquarters in Boston.

Divisional headquarters of 94th Division was moved to Montpelier, Vermont in June 1933 and Trott assumed additional duty as Commander of 6th Civilian Conservation Corps District during the Great Depression.

In August 1934, Trott was transferred to Fort D.A. Russell, Wyoming and served as Commanding officer, 20th Infantry Regiment until the end of August 1935, when he received word about his nomination to the general's officer rank.

Trott was promoted to the rank of Brigadier general on September 1, 1935 and assumed command of 6th Infantry Brigade at Fort Douglas, Utah. He also simultaneously commanded the Fort Douglas and remained in that capacities until March 1936. He then commanded 18th Infantry Brigade in Boston until May 1937 and 22nd Infantry Brigade at Schofield Barracks, Hawaii until July 1939. Following his return to the United States, Trott commanded 16th Infantry Brigade at Camp Meade, Maryland and also the Post.

World War II and retirement

With the outbreak of World War II in Europe in September 1939, Trott was ordered to Camp Jackson, South Carolina and was tasked with organization of reactivated 6th Infantry Division. He supervised the formation and training of 1st, 3rd and 20th Infantry Regiments, the 1st and 80th Artillery Regiments, the 8th Medical Battalion and the 6th Engineer Battalion which were subordinated to the Division.

After one year with the division, Trott was transferred to Fort Hayes, Ohio and assumed command of Fifth Corps Area. While in this capacity, he was promoted to the rank of Major general on April 3, 1941. This command completed 42 years of his service, when he was relieved of duties on September 29, 1941 and ordered home pending retirement. He was finally retired on December 31, 1941 and was not recalled to active duty during World War II due to his age and health.

Trott settled in Geneva, Illinois, where he played golf and was interested in reading and athletics. Major general Clement A. Trott died on April 14, 1950 at his home in Geneva and is buried at Oak Hill Cemetery. His wife, Leah Wright Trott is buried beside him.

Decorations

Here is Major general Trott's ribbon bar:

See also
 List of foreign recipients of the Légion d'Honneur

References

1877 births
1950 deaths
Military personnel from Milwaukee
United States Army generals
United States Military Academy alumni
United States Army Command and General Staff College alumni
United States Army War College alumni
United States Military Academy faculty
American military personnel of the Philippine–American War
United States Army personnel of World War I
Recipients of the Distinguished Service Medal (US Army)
Recipients of the Silver Star
Officiers of the Légion d'honneur
Recipients of the Croix de Guerre 1914–1918 (France)